Dungeons & Dragons Master Rules is an expansion boxed set for the Dungeons & Dragons (D&D) fantasy role-playing game. It was first published in 1985 as an expansion to the Basic Set.

Publication history
The Dungeons & Dragons Basic Set was revised in 1983 by Frank Mentzer, this time as Dungeons & Dragons Set 1: Basic Rules. Between 1983 and 1985, this system was expanded by Mentzer as a series of five boxed sets, including the Basic Rules, Expert Rules (supporting character levels 4 through 14), Companion Rules (supporting levels 15 through 25), Master Rules (supporting levels 26 through 36), and Immortal Rules (supporting Immortals - characters who had transcended levels). The Master Rules set was a boxed set which included a 32-page Master Player's Book and a 64-page Master DM's Book. The books were written by Frank Mentzer and edited by Barbara Green Deer, Anne C. Gray, and Mike Breault, with cover artwork by Larry Elmore and interior illustrations by Jeff Easley and Roger Raupp.

Contents
The Master Player's Book expands the spell lists for the cleric, magic-user, and druid classes. It introduces the mystic class, an empty hand warrior. The book adds to the range of attack ranks for demihuman characters. The book provides rules for Weapons Mastery, a form of weapon specialization and proficiency, where the character starts as a Novice and rises to the rank of Grand Master. There is also a table listing all the weapons found in the D&D game, including all the restrictions (two-handed, use only in melee, etc.), costs, weights, damage at different levels of Mastery, defense uses, and special effects. This book includes experience rules, abilities, and spells for higher-level characters, new armor and weapons, and guidelines for sieges and siege equipment.

The bulk of the Master DM's Book is taken up with an expansion to the lists of magical items and monsters. This book provides a set of firm guidelines for the DM on how to cope with such a high-magic, super-powerful campaign, including how to cope with the paperwork of having players run small empires, and a section on balancing encounters. The book introduces the concept of Anti-Magic, a property possessed by the game's Immortals, and certain monsters like beholders, which reduces or nullifies the effects of magic within its sphere of influence. This book covers rules for character-ruled realms, reality shifts, nonhuman spellcasters, and artifacts.

Reception
The Master Rules set was reviewed by Paul Cockburn in issue 73 of White Dwarf magazine (January 1986), rating it 8 out of 10 overall. Cockburn felt that "the Masters Set doesn't leave you gasping for something simple" and it is "an intelligent, subtle and interesting extension to the game".

References

Further reading
The V.I.P. of Gaming Magazine #2 (1986)

Dungeons & Dragons sourcebooks
Role-playing game supplements introduced in 1985